This is a list of football clubs in Germany by major honours won. It lists every German football club to have won any of the two major domestic trophies in Germany (or West Germany), three major European competitions or the global competitions FIFA has recognised. East German championships are not counted in these tables.

Germany's most successful clubs

Key 
Domestic competitions
 BL = Bundesliga (1963– )
 GC<'63 = German champion before 1963 (1903–1963)
 Cup = DFB-Pokal (1952– ), Tschammerpokal (1935–1943)
 LP = DFL-Ligapokal (2005–2007), DFB-Ligapokal (1972–73, 1997–2004)
 SC = DFL-Supercup (2010– ), DFB-Supercup (1987–1996)
European competitions
 CL/EC = UEFA Champions League (1992– ), European Champion Clubs' Cup (1955–1992)
 CW = UEFA Cup Winners' Cup (1960–1999)
 EL/UC = UEFA Europa League (2009– ), UEFA Cup (1971–2009)
 ECL = UEFA Europa Conference League (2021– )
 USC = UEFA Super Cup (1972–  )
 UIC = UEFA Intertoto Cup (1995–2008)
Worldwide competitions
 WC/IC = FIFA Club World Cup (2005– ), Intercontinental Cup (1960–2004)

Ranking

See also 
 Football in Germany
 List of football clubs in Germany
 German Football Association
 Association football

External links 
Rec.Sport.Soccer Statistics Foundation